Tunas Creek formerly known as Arroyo Escondido, is a stream tributary to the Pecos River, in Pecos County, Texas.

History
The San Antonio-El Paso Road met with and crossed Arroyo Escondido, 16.26 miles west of the place called Leaving of Pecos on the Pecos River and 8.58 miles east of Escondido Spring  also on the creek.  Both these places were watering and resting places for travelers on the route to Comanche Springs and for the stagecoaches of the San Antonio-San Diego Mail Line and other lines.

See also
List of rivers of Texas

References

USGS Geographic Names Information Service
USGS Hydrologic Unit Map - State of Texas (1974)

Bodies of water of Pecos County, Texas
Pecos River
Rivers of Texas
San Antonio–El Paso Road
San Antonio–San Diego Mail Line
Stagecoach stops in the United States